The Old Fritz (German: Der alte Fritz) is a 1928 German silent historical drama film directed by Gerhard Lamprecht and starring Otto Gebühr, Julia Serda and Bertold Reissig. Part of the cycle of Prussian Films, it was released in two parts. Gebühr played the role of Frederick the Great on many occasions during the Weimar Republic and Nazi Germany.

The film's art direction was by Otto Moldenhauer.

Cast

References

External links

1920s historical films
German historical films
Films of the Weimar Republic
Films directed by Gerhard Lamprecht
German silent feature films
Films set in the 1760s
Films set in the 1770s
Films set in the 1780s
Prussian films
National Film films
German black-and-white films
Films released in separate parts
1920s German films